HMS Restoration was a 70-gun third rate of the Kingdom of England built at Harwich Dockyard in 1677/78. After a ten-year stint in Ordinary she was commissioned for the War of the English Succession in 1690. She fought in the Battles of Beachy Head and the Battle of Barfleur. She was rebuilt at Portsmouth in 1699/1702. She was lost on the Goodwin Sands during the Great Storm of November 1703.

This was the first vessel to bear the name Restoration in the English and Royal Navy.

HMS Restoration was awarded the Battle Honour Barfleur 1692.

Construction and Specifications
She was ordered in April 1677 to be built at Harwich Dockyard under the guidance of Master Shipwright Isaac Betts (from 26 May 1677). She was launched on 25 May 1678. Her builder's measure tonnage was calculated as 1,021 tons (burthen).

Her initial gun armament was in accordance with the 1677 Establishment with 72/60 guns consisting of twenty-six demi-cannons (54 cwt, 9.5 ft) on the lower deck, twenty-four 12-pounder guns (32 cwt, 9 ft) on the upper deck, ten sakers (16 cwt, 7 ft) on the quarterdeck and four sakers (16 cwt, 7 ft) on the foc’x’le with four 3-pounder guns (5 cwt, 5 ft) on the poop deck or roundhouse. By 1688 she would carry 70 guns as per the 1685 Establishment, however, the demi-culverins replaced the 12-pounders on the upper deck . Her initial manning establishment would be for a crew of 460/380/300 personnel.

Commissioned Service

Service 1678 to 1699
She was commissioned on 15 May 1678 under the command of Captain John Brookes until his death on 3 August 1678. In 1690 she was under command of Captain William Botham for the Battle of Beachy Head in Centre (Red) Squadron on 30 June 1690, where Captain Botham was killed. After the battle Captain Edward Stanley was appointed her commander. In 1691 she was under Captain James Gother for the Battle of Barfleur in Centre (Red) Squadron, Centre Division from 19 to 22 May 1692. Later in the year of 1692 she was under Captain Benjamin Hoskins until 1693 then he was followed by Captain Humphrey Saunders. During 1694 she was under Captain William Cross. During 1696/98 she was under Captain Thomas Foulis sailing with the Fleet. She would be rebuilt at Portsmouth in 1702.

Rebuild at Portsmouth 1699-1702
She was ordered rebuilt on 25 February 1699 at Portsmouth under the guidance of Master Shipwright Elias Waffe. She was launched/completed on 22 January 1702. Her builder's measure tonnage was calculated as 1,044 tons (burthen). She probably retained her armament as stated in the 1685 Establishment, though it is unclear if her armament was changed to the 1703 Establishment later. It is known that when completed her gun armament total at least 70 guns.

Service 1702-03
She was commissioned in 1702 under the command of Captain Robert Fairfax. In January 1703 she was temporarily under the command of Captain Edward Whitaker followed by Captain Fleetwood Ernes a few days later.

Loss
During the Great Storm of 26/27 November 1703, Restoration was wrecked on the Goodwin Sands. All 387 (some references say 391) men were lost, including Captain Fleetwood Ernes.

Wreck
Local divers found the wreck site in 1980. The initial designation was of 50  around what is now known as the South Mound; the North Mound was discovered in 1999 and the area was amended under Statutory Instrument number 2004/2395 as a 300 m radius around 51° 15.6302' N, 01° 30.0262' E. It is believed that the Restoration lies under the North Mound and the South Mound is the fourth rate HMS Mary wrecked in the same storm, but this is not known for certain. The site lies 100 m to the west of the Goodwin Sands off Deal, near the wrecks of HMS Stirling Castle and HMS Northumberland which also sank in the storm.

The site was investigated by Wessex Archaeology on 25 June 2006. They found copper-clad timbers, a cannon, lead pipes and hearth bricks.

Notes

Citations

References

 Colledge (2020), Ships of the Royal Navy, by J.J. Colledge, revised and updated by Lt Cdr Ben Warlow and Steve Bush, published by Seaforth Publishing, Barnsley, Great Britain, © 2020,  (EPUB), Section R (Restoration)
 Winfield (2009), British Warships in the Age of Sail (1603 – 1714), by Rif Winfield, published by Seaforth Publishing, England © 2009, EPUB 
 Lavery, Brian (2003) The Ship of the Line - Volume 1: The Development of the Battlefleet 1650-1850. Conway Maritime Press. 
 Clowes (1898), The Royal Navy, A History from the Earliest Times to the Present (Vol. II). London. England: Sampson Low, Marston & Company, © 1898
 Thomas (1998), Battles and Honours of the Royal Navy, by David A. Thomas, first published in Great Britain by Leo Cooper 1998, Copyright © David A. Thomas 1998,

External links
 Restoration HMS and many other ships lost during this storm on the wrecksite
 "Restoration" National Heritage List for England

Ships of the line of the Royal Navy
Maritime incidents in 1703
Shipwrecks in the Downs
1670s ships
Ships built in Harwich
Protected Wrecks of England
1678 in England
1703 in England
History of Kent